This is a list of best-selling mobile phones. The best-selling mobile device are the bar phone Nokia 1100 and Nokia 1110, released in 2003 and 2005, respectively. Both years have sold over 250 million units. The best-selling touchscreen phones are the Apple iPhone 6 and 6 Plus, both released in 2014. Together, they have sold over 222 million units. The best selling flip phone is the Motorola RAZR V3, released in 2004. It sold over 130 million units. The best-selling slider phone is the Samsung E250, released in 2006. It has sold over 30 million units.

Of the 115 phones on the list, Samsung sold the most models, with 37. Nokia has 27 models, including four of the top 10. Apple has 16 entries on the list, including the six best selling touchscreen phones, which comprise the remainder of the top 10.

In 2022, about 1.35 billion mobile phones were sold, with Apple dominating yearly sales at over 253 million units sold, taking up 24/8% market share. Combined, all mobile phones have shipped over 19billion units worldwide between 1994 and 2018.

Top-selling mobile phones

Annually best-sold handsets

Note: The years represent when the phones were released into the market, not the number sold in that particular year. The number sold represents how many units were sold throughout its whole lifetime. The first cell phone was produced by Motorola. Since then there had been produced around 17.37 billion mobile phones .

1996
 Motorola StarTAC, 60 million sold

1999
 Nokia 3210, 160 million sold

2000
 Nokia 3310, 126 million sold
 Nokia 8890, 15 million sold

2002

 Nokia 6100, 15 million sold
 Nokia 6610, 15 million sold
 Nokia 3510, 15 million sold
 Samsung SGH-T100, 12 million sold

2003

Nokia 1100, 250 million sold
 Nokia 6600, 150 million sold
 Motorola C200, 60 million sold
 Nokia 3100/3120, 50 million sold
 Nokia 2100, 20 million sold
 Samsung SGH-E700, 10 million sold
 Nokia N-Gage, 3 million sold

2004
 Nokia 2600/2610/2626/2630, 135 million sold
 Motorola RAZR V3, 130 million sold
 Nokia 6010/6020/6030, 75 million sold
 Nokia 6230/6233, 50 million sold
 Nokia 2650, 35 million sold
 Sony Ericsson K300/K310, 15 million sold
 Samsung SGH-D500, 12 million sold

2005

 Nokia 1110, 250 million sold
 Nokia 1600/1650/1661, 130 million sold
 Motorola C139, 60 million sold
 Nokia N70/N72/N73, 45 million sold
 Nokia 6101, 35 million sold
 Nokia 6060, 35 million sold
 Nokia 6270/6280, 30 million sold
 Motorola V220, 15 million sold
 Motorola V195, 15 million sold
 Sony Ericsson K750, 15 million sold
 Nokia 8800, 15 million sold
 Nokia 6111, 15 million sold
 Nokia 2680, 15 million sold
 Motorola Q, 1 million sold

2006
 Nokia 6070/6080, 50 million sold
 Nokia 7360/7370/7380, 45 million sold
 Nokia 6300, 47 million sold
 Nokia 2310, 35 million sold
 Nokia 5200/5300, 30 million sold
 Samsung SGH-E250, 30 million sold
 LG Chocolate VX8500, 21 million sold
 BlackBerry Pearl 8100, 15 million sold
 BenQ-Siemens S68, 15 million sold
 Sony Ericsson W800/W810, 15 million sold
 Sony Ericsson W300, 15 million sold
 Samsung SGH-D900, 3 million sold
 Nokia 3250, 1 million sold

2007

 Nokia 1200, 150 million sold
 Nokia 1208 (1209), 100 million sold
 Nokia 2600 classic, 15 million sold
 Nokia 3110 classic, 15 million sold
 Nokia 6500 slide, 15 million sold
 Nokia N95, 10 million sold
 Apple iPhone, 6 million sold
 LG Viewty (KU990), 5 million sold
 HTC Touch, 2 million sold
 Palm Centro, 2 million sold

2008
 LG KP100, 30 million sold
 Apple iPhone 3G, 25 million sold
 Nokia 2330 classic, 15 million sold
 Nokia 7210 Supernova, 15 million sold
 Nokia 5800 XpressMusic, 15 million sold
 Nokia 5610 XpressMusic, 15 million sold
 Nokia E71, 15 million sold
 Samsung Tocco (SGH-F480), 12 million sold
 Samsung SGH-J700, 12 million sold
 LG Shine, 10 million sold
 Samsung Tocco TouchWiz (SGH-F480), 5 million sold
 Samsung Soul (SGH-U900), 1 million sold

2009

 Nokia 5230, 150 million sold
 Apple iPhone 3GS, 35 million sold
 LG Cookie (KP500), 13 million sold
 Samsung Tocco Ultra (S8300), 12 million sold
 Samsung Star/Tocco Lite (S5230), 10 million sold
 Alcatel One Touch Mini (OT-708), 5 million sold
 Motorola Ming A1200, 3 million sold
 Nokia N97, 2 million sold
 Motorola Milestone/Droid, 1 million sold
 HTC Magic, 1 million sold

2010
 Nokia 1280, 100 million sold
 Apple iPhone 4, 50 million sold
 Samsung Galaxy S, 20 million sold
 Samsung S5620 Monte, 7 million sold
 Nokia N8, 6 million sold
 Motorola Milestone/Droid, 2 million sold
 Samsung Wave (S8500), 2 million sold

2011
 Apple iPhone 4S, 60 million sold
 Samsung Galaxy S II, 40 million sold
 Samsung Galaxy Y, 15 million sold
 HTC Evo 4G, 14 million sold
 Motorola Droid Bionic, 13 million sold
 Samsung Galaxy Note, 10 million sold
 ZTE Blade, 10 million sold
 Samsung Infuse, 9 million sold

2012
 Apple iPhone 5, 70 million sold
 Samsung Galaxy S III and Galaxy S III Mini, 70 million sold
 Samsung Galaxy Note II, 30 million sold
 Xiaomi Mi 2, 10 million sold

2013
 Nokia 105 (2013) and Nokia 105 (2015), 200 million sold
 Samsung Galaxy S4, 80 million sold
 Apple iPhone 5S, 52 million sold
 Samsung Galaxy Note 3, 10 million sold
 LG G2, 3 million sold

2014
 Apple iPhone 6 and iPhone 6 Plus, 222.4 million sold
 LG G3, 10 million sold
 Samsung Galaxy Note 4, 4.5 million sold

2015
 Samsung Galaxy S6 and Galaxy S6 edge, 45 million sold
 Huawei Mate 9, 15.8 million sold
 Apple iPhone 6S and iPhone 6S Plus, 13 million sold

2016
 Apple iPhone 7 and iPhone 7 Plus, 78.3 million sold
 Samsung Galaxy S7 and Galaxy S7 edge, 55 million sold
 Samsung Galaxy Grand Prime Plus, 24.2 million sold
 Oppo F1 Plus, 7 million sold
 LeEco Le 1s, 3 million sold
 Google Pixel and Pixel XL, 2.1 million sold

2017
 Apple iPhone 8 and iPhone 8 Plus, 86.3 million sold
 Apple iPhone X, 63 million sold
 Samsung Galaxy S8 and Galaxy S8+, 41 million sold
 Huawei Mate 10 and Mate 10 Pro, 17 million sold
 Samsung Galaxy Note 8, 10 million sold

2018
 Apple iPhone XR, 77.4 million sold
 Apple iPhone XS and iPhone XS Max, 48 million sold
 Samsung Galaxy S9 and Galaxy S9+, 35.4 million sold
 Huawei P20, P20 Pro and P20 Lite, 32 million sold
 Huawei Mate 20 and Mate 20 Pro, 17 million sold
 Samsung Galaxy J2 Core, 15.2 million sold
 Samsung Galaxy Note 9, 9.6 million sold
 Samsung Galaxy J4+, 6.4 million sold
 Samsung Galaxy J6+, 4.9 million sold

2019
 Apple iPhone 11, 102 million sold
 Apple iPhone 11 Pro and iPhone 11 Pro Max, 47.5 million sold
 Samsung Galaxy S10, Galaxy S10+ and Galaxy S10e, 37 million sold
 Samsung Galaxy A10, 30.3 million sold
 Xiaomi Redmi Note 8 and Redmi Note 8 Pro, 30 million sold
 Samsung Galaxy A50, 24.2 million sold
 Samsung Galaxy A51, 23.2 million sold
 Samsung Galaxy A20, 23.1 million sold
 Xiaomi Redmi Note 7 and Redmi Note 7 Pro, 20 million sold
 Huawei P30 and P30 Pro, 20 million sold
 Samsung Galaxy A01, 16.9 million sold
 Huawei Mate 30 and Mate 30 Pro, 12 million sold
 Redmi 6A, 10 million sold
 Oppo A5, 9.7 million sold
 Samsung Galaxy A30, 9.2 million sold
 Redmi 8A, 7.3 million sold
 Redmi 8, 6.8 million sold
 Samsung Galaxy A10s, 3.9 million sold
 Samsung Galaxy A30s, 3.4 million sold

2020
 Apple iPhone 12, iPhone 12 mini, iPhone 12 Pro and iPhone 12 Pro Max, 300 million sold
 Samsung Galaxy S20, Galaxy S20+ and Galaxy S20 Ultra, 28 million sold
 Apple iPhone SE (2nd generation), 24.2 million sold
 Samsung Galaxy A21s, 19.4 million sold
 Samsung Galaxy A11, 15.3 million sold
 Xiaomi Redmi Note 9 Pro, 15 million sold

2021
 Apple iPhone 12, iPhone 12 mini, iPhone 12 Pro and iPhone 12 Pro Max
 Apple iPhone 13, iPhone 13 mini, iPhone 13 Pro and iPhone 13 Pro Max
 Apple iPhone 11
 Samsung Galaxy A12
 Xiaomi Redmi 9A
 Apple iPhone SE (2nd generation)
 Xiaomi Redmi 9

2022
 iPhone 13, iPhone 13 mini, iPhone 13 Pro and iPhone 13 Pro Max
 iPhone 14 and iPhone 14 Pro series, 26 million sold
 Samsung Galaxy A13
 iPhone 12 and iPhone 12 mini
 iPhone SE (3rd generation)
 Samsung Galaxy A03

Annual sales by manufacturer

note: this table is created from the data listed below. from 2015 onward the figures reflect only sales of smartphones (as opposed to feature phones)

1992
 Motorola: 4 million sold
 Nokia: 3 million sold
 NEC: 2 million sold

1993
 Nokia: 5 million sold

1994
 Motorola 12 million sold
 Nokia: 9 million sold
 NEC: 6 million sold

1995
 Nokia: 13 million sold

1996
 Motorola: 60 million sold
 Nokia: 18 million sold

1997

 Motorola: 25.328 million sold
 Nokia: 20.593 million sold
 Ericsson: 15.914 million sold
 Panasonic: 8.627 million sold
 Alcatel: 2.631 million sold
 Others: 34.725 million sold
 Total: 107.818 million sold

1998

 Nokia: 37.374 million sold
 Motorola: 32.319 million sold
 Ericsson: 23.827 million sold
 Panasonic: 13.397 million sold
 Alcatel: 6.967 million sold
 Samsung: 4.686 million sold
 Others: 44.286 million sold
 Total: 162.856 million sold

1999

 Nokia: 76.335 million sold
 Motorola: 47.818 million sold
 Ericsson: 29.785 million sold
 Samsung: 17.687 million sold
 Panasonic: 15.581 million sold
 Others: 96.376 million sold
 Total: 283.581 million sold

2000

 Nokia: 126.369 million sold
 Motorola: 60.094 million sold
 Ericsson: 41.467 million sold
 Siemens: 26.989 million sold
 Samsung: 20.639 million sold
 Others: 137.173 million sold
 Total: 412.731 million sold

2001
 Nokia: 139.672 million sold
 Motorola: 59.097 million sold
 Siemens: 29.753 million sold
 Samsung: 28.234 million sold
 Ericsson: 26.956 million sold
 Others: 115.877 million sold
 Total: 399.583 million sold

2002

 Nokia: 151.4218 million (35.8% market share)
 Motorola: 64.6401 million (15.3% market share)
 Samsung: 41.6844 million (9.8% market share)
 Siemens: 34.6180 million (8.2% market share)
 Sony Ericsson: 23.1129 million (5.5% market share)
 Others: 107.9414 million (25.5% market share)
 Total: 423.4185 million

2003

 Nokia: 180.6724 million (34.7% market share)
 Motorola: 75.1771 million (14.5% market share)
 Samsung: 54.4751 million (10.5% market share)
 Siemens: 43.7543 million (8.4% market share)
 Sony Ericsson: 26.6863 million (5.1% market share)
 LG: 26.2137 million (5.0% market share)
 Others: 113.0096 million (21.8% market share)
 Total: 519.9855 million

2004

 Nokia: 207.2313 million (30.7% market share)
 Motorola: 104.1242 million (15.4% market share)
 Samsung: 85.2384 million (12.6% market share)
 Siemens: 48.4558 million (7.2% market share)
 LG: 42.2768 million (6.3% market share)
 Sony Ericsson: 42.0317 million (6.2% market share)
 Others: 144.6437 million (21.6% market share)
 Total: 674.0019 million

2005

 Nokia: 265.6148 million (32.5% market share)
 Motorola: 144.9204 million (17.7% market share)
 Samsung: 103.7536 million (12.7% market share)
 LG: 54.9246 million (6.7% market share)
 Sony Ericsson: 51.7738 million (6.3% market share)
 Siemens: 28.5906 million (3.5% market share)
 Others: 166.9851 million (20.6% market share)
 Total: 816.5629 million

2006

 Nokia: 344.9159 million (34.8% market share)
 Motorola: 209.2509 million (21.1% market share)
 Samsung: 116.4801 million (11.8% market share)
 Sony Ericsson: 73.6416 million (7.4% market share)
 LG: 61.9860 million (6.3% market share)
 Others: 184.5880 million (18.6% market share)
 Total: 990.8625 million

2007

 Nokia: 435.4531 million (37.8% market share)
 Motorola: 164.307 million (14.3% market share)
 Samsung: 154.5407 million (13.4% market share)
 Sony Ericsson: 101.3584 million (8.8% market share)
 LG: 78.5763 million (6.8% market share)
 Apple: 2.3 million sold
 Others: 218.6043 million (18.9% market share)
 Total: 1,152.8398 million

2008

 Nokia: 472,315,000 (38.6% market share)
 Samsung: 199,182,000 (16.3% market share)
 Motorola: 106,590,000 (8.7% market share)
 LG: 102,555,400 (8.4% market share)
 Sony Ericsson: 93,414,500 (7.6% market share)
 Apple: 12,000,000 sold
 Others: 248,189,000 (20.4% market share)
 Total: 1,222,245,200

2009

 Nokia: 440.8816 million (36.4% market share)
 Samsung: 235.7720 million (19.5% market share)
 LG: 122.0553 million (10.1%market share)
 Motorola: 58.4752 million (4.8% market share)
 Sony Ericsson: 54.8734 million (4.5% market share)
 Apple: 24.889 million sold
 Others: 299.1792 million (24.7% market share)
 Total: 1,211.2366 million

2010

 Nokia: 461.3182 million (28.9% market share)
 Samsung: 281.0658 million (17.6% market share)
 LG: 114.1546 million (7.1% market share)
 Research in Motion: 47.4516 million (3.0% market share)
 Apple: 46.5983 million (2.9% market share)
 Sony Ericsson: 41.8192 million (2.6% market share)
 Motorola: 38.5537 million (2.4% market share)
 ZTE: 28.7687 million (1.8% market share)
 HTC: 24.6884 million (1.5% market share)
 Huawei: 23.8147 million (1.5% market share)
 Others: 488.5693 million (30.6% market share)
 Total: 1,596.8024 million

2011

 Nokia: 422.4783 million (23.8% market share)
 Samsung: 313.9042 million (17.7% market share)
 Apple: 89.2632 million (5.0% market share)
 LG: 86.3709 million (4.9% market share)
 ZTE: 56.8818 million (3.2% market share)
 Research in Motion: 51.5419 million (2.9% market share)
 HTC: 43.2669 million (2.4% market share)
 Huawei: 40.6634 million (2.3% market share)
 Motorola: 40.2690 million (2.3% market share)
 Sony Ericsson: 32.5975 million (1.8% market share)
 Others: 597.3269 million (33.7% market share)
 Total: 1,774.5641 million

2012

 Samsung: 384.6312 million (22.0% market share)
 Nokia: 333.9380 million (19.1% market share)
 Apple: 130.1332 million (7.5% market share)
 ZTE: 67.3444 million (3.9% market share)
 LG: 58.0159 million (3.3% market share)
 Huawei Technologies: 47.2883 million (2.7% market share)
 TCL Communication: 37.1766 million (2.1% market share)
 Research in Motion: 34.2103 million (2.0% market share)
 Motorola: 33.9163 million (1.9% market share)
 HTC: 32.1218 million (1.8% market share)
 Sony Ericsson: 29.2 million
 Others: 587.3996 million (33.6% market share)
 Total: 1,746.1756 million

2013

 Samsung: 444.4442 million (24.6% market share)
 Nokia: 250.7931 million (13.9% market share)
 Apple: 150.7859 million (8.3% market share)
 LG: 69.0245 million (3.8% market share)
 ZTE: 59.8988 million (3.3% market share)
 Huawei: 53.2951 million (2.9% market share)
 TCL Communication: 49.5313 million (2.7% market share)
 Lenovo: 45.2847 million (2.5% market share)
 Sony Mobile Communications: 37.5957 million (2.1% market share)
 Yulong: 32.6014 million (1.8% market share)
 Others: 613.7100 million (34% market share)
 Total: 1,806.9647 million

2014

 Samsung: 392.546 million (20.9% market share)
 Apple: 191.426 million (10.2% market share)
 Microsoft: 185.660 million (9.9% market share)
 Lenovo Motorola: 84.029 million (4.5% market share)
 LG: 76.096 million (4% market share)
 Huawei: 70.499 million (3.8% market share)
 TCL Communication: 64.026 million (3.4% market share)
 Xiaomi: 56.529 million (3% market share)
 ZTE: 53.910 million (2.9% market share)
 Sony Mobile: 37.791 million (2% market share)
 Micromax: 37.094 million (2% market share)
 Others: 629.360 million (33.5% market share)
 Total: 1,878.968 million

2015

Note that previous years have listed sales of mobile phones including non smartphones (so called feature phones) while from 2015 and on the statistics only show smartphone sales.
 Samsung: 320.4 million (22.5% market share)
 Apple: 225.8506 million (15.9% market share)
 Huawei: 104.0947 million (7.3% market share)
 Lenovo: 72.7482 million (5.1% market share)
 Xiaomi: 65.6186 million (4.6% market share)
 Others: 635.3685 million (44.6% market share)
 Total: 1,423.9003 million

2016

 Samsung: 306.4466 million (20.5% market share)
 Apple: 216.0640 million (14.4% market share)
 Huawei: 132.8249 million (8.9% market share)
 OPPO: 85.2995 million (5.7% market share)
 BBK Communication Equipment excl. oppo: 72.4086 million (4.8% market share)
 Others: 682.3143 million (45.6% market share)
 Total: 1,495.3580 million

2017

 Samsung: 321.2633 million (20.9% market share)
 Apple: 214.9244 million (14% market share)
 Huawei: 150.534.3 million (9.8% market share)
 OPPO: 112.124 million (7.3% market share)
 Vivo: 99.6848 million (6.5% market share)
 Others: 638.0047 million (41.5% market share)
 Total: 1,536.5355 million

2018

 Samsung: 295.0437 million (19% market share)
 Apple: 209.0484 million (13.4% market share)
 Huawei: 202.9014 million (13% market share)
 Xiaomi: 122.3870 million (7.9% market share)
 OPPO: 118.837.5 million (7.6% market share)
 Others: 607.0490 million (39% market share)
 Total: 1,555,267.0

2019 

 Samsung: 296.194 million (19.2% market share)
 Huawei: 240.6155 million (15.6% market share)
 Apple: 193.4751 million (10.5% market share)
 Xiaomi: 126.0492 million (8.2% market share)
 OPPO: 118.6932 million (7.7% market share)
 Others: 565.630 million (36.7% market share)
 Total: 1,540.657 million

2020 

 Samsung: 253 million (18.8% market share)
 Apple: 199.8 million (14.8% market share)
 Huawei: 182.6 million (13.5% market share)
 Xiaomi: 145.8 million (10.8% market share)
 OPPO: 111.8 million (8.3% market share)
 Others: 454.8 million (33.7% market share)
 Total: 1,347.9 million

2021 

 Samsung: 272 million (21% market share)
 Apple: 237 million (16% market share)
 Xiaomi: 190 million (14% market share)
 OPPO: 143 million (11% market share)
 Vivo: 131 million (10% market share)
 Others: 413 million (28% market share)
 Total: 1.391 Billion

2022 

 Samsung: 260.9 million (21.6% market share)
 Apple: 226.4 million (18.8% market share)
 Xiaomi: 153.1 million (12.7% market share)
 OPPO: 103.3 million (8.6% market share)
 Vivo: 99.0 million (8.2% market share)
 Others: 362.7 million (30.1% market share)
 Total: 1.2005 Billion

See also

Notes

Top 25 Best Phone | Smartphone & Android

References

 
Mobile phones